FC Dinamo MVD Bishkek is a Kyrgyzstani football club based in Bishkek, Kyrgyzstan that played in the top division in Kyrgyzstan, the Kyrgyzstan League.  The club plays its home games at Dynamo Stadion.

History 
193?: Founded as FC Dinamo Frunze.
1992: Renamed FC Dinamo Bishkek.
1996: Renamed FC Dinamo-Oil Bishkek.
1997: Renamed FC Dinamo Bishkek.
1998: Renamed FC CAG-Dinamo-MVD Bishkek.
2001: Renamed FC Erkin Farm Bishkek.
2002: Renamed FC Dinamo-Erkin Farm Bishkek.
2003: Renamed FC Dinamo-Polyot Bishkek.
2003: Dissolved.
 ?  : Refounded as FC Dinamo MVD Bishkek.

Achievements 
Kyrgyzstan League: 3
Winner: 1997, 1998, 1999

Kyrgyzstan Cup: 1
Finalist: 1995

References
 Dinamo MVD squad
Summer transfers 2012

External links 
Career stats by KLISF

Football clubs in Kyrgyzstan
Football clubs in Bishkek